The 1968–69 LSU Tigers basketball team represented Louisiana State University as a member of the Southeastern Conference during the 1968–69 NCAA men's basketball season. The team’s head coach was Press Maravich, in his third season at LSU. They played their home games at the John M. Parker Agricultural Coliseum in Baton Rouge, Louisiana. The Tigers finished the season 13–13, 7–11 in SEC play to finish in seventh place.

Roster

Schedule and results

|-
!colspan=9 style=|Regular season

Awards and honors
Pete Maravich – Consensus First-team All-American (2x), NCAA Scoring Leader (2x), SEC Player of the Year (2x), All-time single-season NCAA scoring average (44.2 ppg)

References 

LSU Tigers basketball seasons
LSU
LSU
LSU